Disconnected in New York City is a 2013 live album by Los Lobos.

Track listing
Intro 
"The Neighborhood"
"Oh Yeah"
"Chuco's Cumbia"
"Tears of God"
"Venganza"
"Tin Can Trust"
"Gotta Let You Know"
"Maria Christina"
"Malaque"
"Little Things"
"Set Me Free Rosa Lee"
"La Bamba/Good Lovin'" - Medley

References

2013 live albums
Los Lobos albums